Burton is a village in the community of Rossett in Wrexham County Borough, Wales. The hamlet of Burton Green is a separate settlement and is located around a mile northwest from Burton.

The village is predominantly rural in nature and comprises a mixture of working farms and residential properties.

Burton is 2 miles from the larger village of Rossett, where there is a variety of shops, a primary school, a secondary school, a post office, chemist, a Catholic church, off-licence, and plenty of good pubs and eateries including the award-winning Welsh restaurant 'The Machine House'. There is a popular monthly farmers' market in the village hall.

Despite the proximity to the border with England, 7.7% of Burton residents are Welsh speakers.

History 
It is an ancient village that, before the coming of the North Wales Mineral Railway, was more important than Rossett itself. The village dates back to Saxon times and was settled by Anglo-Saxons from the Kingdom of Mercia. Today the village is little more than a backwater on the old road between Rossett and Caergwrle.

In the early part of 2002 a trio of friends were metal detecting on a farm close to Burton, when they found a hoard of gold and other artifacts from the Bronze Age. These included a twisted wire bracelet, a necklace called a torc, a bracelet, a pendant and a collection of beads and rings - all gold, along with several axes. The finds later to be known as 'The Burton Hoard' were declared treasure trove and purchased by the National Museum Wales (formerly NMGW) for £85,000.

In September 2021, a three-week archaeological dig was conducted following the discovery of a Roman villa on farmland near Burton Green.

References

External links 

Photographs of Burton and surrounding area on geograph

Villages in Wrexham County Borough